Daniel Rhys Jefferies (born 30 January 1999) is a Welsh footballer who plays as a centre-back for Cymru Premier side Penybont F.C.

Jefferies is a product of the Swansea City Academy. He left the club in 2017 to join Colchester United. He joined Dundee in January 2018 and during his time there had a loan spell with Partick Thistle.

He has represented Wales at under-15, under-16 and under-17 level.

Club career
Born in Bridgend, Wales, Jefferies attended Coleg Cymunedol Y Dderwen in Tondu, and later Cwmtawe Community School in Pontardawe while playing for the Swansea City Academy.

Jefferies made 14 appearances for the Swansea under-18 team during the 2016–17 season. He appeared on trial for Colchester United's under-18 and under-23s in early 2017. Colchester confirmed the signing of Jefferies from Swansea on 28 July 2017.

On 31 January 2018, he left Colchester and signed for Scottish Premiership side Dundee after appearing for the club on trial. He made his senior debut on 5 May 2018, against Hamilton Academical.

On 31 August 2018, Jefferies joined Scottish Championship club Partick Thistle on loan.

At the end of the 2018–19 season, Jefferies was released by Dundee.

International career
Jefferies has played for Wales at under-15, under-16, and under-17 level.

He was a member of the Victory Shield-winning under-16 side in 2014.

Career statistics

Honours
Wales U16
2014 Victory Shield winner

References

External links

1999 births
Living people
Footballers from Bridgend
Welsh footballers
Association football defenders
Wales youth international footballers
Swansea City A.F.C. players
Colchester United F.C. players
Dundee F.C. players
Scottish Professional Football League players
Partick Thistle F.C. players
Penybont F.C. players
Cymru Premier players